Zafar Iqbal (born 25 September 1950 or 25 April 1950 – died 6 January 1991 or 1992) was a Bangladeshi actor, singer and freedom fighter. He acted in 150 films. Singer Shahnaz Rahmatullah and music composer Anwar Parvez were his siblings.

Background

Iqbal learned to play guitar in the 1970s. He formed his own band Rambling Stone in 1966 with two of his friends named Mukit & Akash. The band used to perform regularly at the hotel InterContinental Dhaka. Music director Robin Ghosh hired him as a session guitarist for his upcoming film Pitch Dhala Poth. During one of those shows, director Khan Ataur Rahman met Iqbal and offered him work as an actor in a lead role for the film Apan Por .

Career
After the Bangladesh Liberation War, Iqbal started acting regularly from the mid-1970s. He acted in films including Shurjo Shongram, its sequel Shurjo Grahan, Mastan (1975), Bedin, Chor, Ongshidar, Noyoner Alo (1984), Ashirbad, Abishkar, Morjada, Chobol, Shikar, Jogajog, Premik, Shondhi, Akorshon, Obodan, Miss Lanka, Doshi, Shahosh, Gorjon, Kabin, Chorer Bou, Usila, Srodhdha, Shajano Bagan, Bondhu Amar, Lawarish, MohaShotru and Lokhkhir Shongshar. He co-starred with actress Bobita in more than 30 films.

In the mid-1980s, Iqbal released a solo album. He died of liver failure in 1991.

Personal life
Iqbal was married to Sonia. Together they had two sons, Shadab and Zain.

Filmography

Notes

References

External links
 

1950 births
1991 deaths
Bangladeshi male film actors
Bangladeshi male musicians
Burials at Azimpur Graveyard
Place of death missing
20th-century male musicians